Her Friend Adam is a Canadian short drama film, written and directed by Ben Petrie and released in 2016. The film stars Petrie as Robert, a man whose insecurities about his relationship with his girlfriend Liv (Grace Glowicki) explode into a fight after he suspects her of having an affair with her friend Adam (Andrew Chown) even though Adam is gay.

The film premiered at the 2016 Sundance Film Festival, where Glowicki won a Special Jury Award for Outstanding Performance.

It was named to the Toronto International Film Festival's annual year-end Canada's Top Ten list for 2016.

References

External links

2016 films
Canadian LGBT-related short films
2016 LGBT-related films
LGBT-related drama films
2016 drama films
2010s English-language films
Canadian drama short films
2010s Canadian films